This is the list of best-selling albums in Taiwan. Seven domestic albums and one international album have shipped over a million copies in Taiwan. Hong Kong singer Jacky Cheung is the best-selling artist in Taiwan, with three albums sold over one million copies, while Taiwanese singer A-Mei is the best-selling female artist in Taiwan. Taiwan's album sales peaked in the 1990s, but it was adversely affected by the copyright infringement and Internet downloads since the 21st century. Sales certifications in Taiwan are awarded by the Recording Industry Foundation in Taiwan (RIT) since August 1996.

Best-selling albums

Best-selling album by year

See also

 Music of Taiwan

References

External links
  Recording Industry Foundation in Taiwan

Taiwan
Taiwanese music
Taiwanese music-related lists